Cinesias may refer to:
Cinesias (character)
Cinesias (poet)